Borrasca (English: Storm) is a Mexican telenovela produced by Televisa and broadcast by Telesistema Mexicano in 1962.

Cast 
Maricruz Olivier
Prudencia Grifell
Félix González
Silvia Suárez

References

External links 

Mexican telenovelas
1962 telenovelas
Televisa telenovelas
1962 Mexican television series debuts
1962 Mexican television series endings
Spanish-language telenovelas